Săvârșin is a commune in Arad County, Romania. Săvârșin commune lies at the foot of the Metaliferi Mountains, at its contact point with the Mureș Couloir. Its surface occupies approximately 22000 hectares and it is composed of nine villages: Căprioara (Kaprióra), Cuiaș (Felsőköves), Hălăliș (Áldásos), Pârnești (Pernyefalva), Săvârșin (situated at 87 km from Arad), Temeșești (Temesd), Toc (Tok), Troaș (Trojás) and Valea Mare (Marosnagyvölgy).

Săvârșin is best known for the royal palace Săvârșin Castle.

Population
According to the last census the population of the commune counts 3290 inhabitants, out of which 98.1% are Romanians, 1.0% Hungarians, 0.3% Ukrainians, 0.3% Serbs and 0.3% are of other or undeclared nationalities.

History
The first documentary records of Săvârșin, Hălăliș, Pârnești and Temeșești date back to 1479. Căprioara was attested documentarily in 1256, Cuiaș in 1477, Toc in 1743, Troaș in 1828 and Valea Mare in 1717.

Economy
Agriculture, silviculture, timber industry, industry of building materials represented by exploitation of granite (Săvârșin) and
marble (Căprioara), mining based on exploitation of molybdenum (Troaș) and tourism are the main economic branches of
the commune.

Tourism
The natural reservations called "Peștera lui Duțu" and "Peștera lui Sinesie", the collections of decorative fine arts (universal graphics, graphics and paintings made by Eugen Popa and Gina Hagiu) and of
ethnography in Săvârșin, the ethnographic museum with popular costumes, folkweave, icons, ceramics in Temeșești, the
wooden church called "Sfinții Trei Ierarhi" (1782) in Troaș, the reinforced settlement and the archaeological site situated in
"Dâmbul Tătarilor" and "Gomile" are only a few of the numerous spectacles which are worth visiting.

Beside these, there is the Săvârșin Castle (18th century), owned by former King Michael of Romania. In 2005 the royal residence in Săvârșin entered the touristic circuit, but since 2007 it has been in restoration and cannot be visited until the renovation is completed.

References

Communes in Arad County
Localities in Crișana